The Miss Perú 2006 was held on April 19, 2006. That year, only 24 candidates were competing for the national crown. The chosen winner represented Peru at the Miss Universe 2006. The Miss Earth Perú would enter in Miss Earth 2006.

Placements

Special Awards

 Best Regional Costume - Loreto - Verónica Navarrete
 Miss Photogenic - Arequipa - Giulliana Cateriano
 Miss Elegance - Pasco - Alice Raschio
 Miss Body - Loreto - Verónica Navarrete
 Best Hair - Junín - Odilia García
 Miss Congeniality - Huancavelica - Mayra Chang
 Most Beautiful Face - San Martín - Paola Merea
 Best Smile - Callao - Graciela Mc Evoy
 Miss Internet - Loreto - Verónica Navarrete

Delegates

Amazonas - Verónica Tamashiro 
Áncash - Valery Caroline Neff
Apurímac - Guisella Valencia
Arequipa - Giulliana Cateriano
Ayacucho - Patricia Ríos
Cajamarca - Stefanía Gutiérrez
Callao - Graciela McEvoy
Cuzco - Alia Sumar
Huancavelica - Mayra Chang
Huánuco - Joana Arévalo
Ica - Ana Laura Oliva
Junín - Odilia Pamela García

Lambayeque - Fiorella Viñas
Loreto - Verónica Navarrete
Madre de Dios - Carla River
Moquegua - María Elena Mercado
Pasco - Alice Raschio
Piura - Priscilla Zapata
Puno - Patricia del Castillo
Region Lima - Cinthia Vidaurre
San Martín - Paola Merea
Tacna - Fiorella Sofía Luna
Tumbes - Milagros Márquez
Ucayali - Rosalinda Aliaga

Background Music

Opening Show – Eva Ayllón - "Morropón de San Miguel"
Swimsuit Competition – Marisela - "Quizas, Quizas, Quizas"
Evening Gown Competition – Michael Bolton - "Once In A Lifetime"

Miss World Peru

The Miss World Peru 2006 pageant was held on June 18, 2006, That year, 23 candidates from different regions of Peru were competing for the national crown. The show host by Jorge Belevan and Claudia Hernandez Ore, The event were a live broadcast by Panamericana Television.

The chosen winner represented Peru at Miss World 2006. The rest of the finalists would enter in different pageants.

Placements

MWP Special Awards

 Most Beautiful Face - Lambayeque - Brenda Aguirre
 Miss Congeniality - Apurímac - Maria Greta Deza
 Best Dress Designer Award - La Libertad - Silvia Cornejo
 Best Model - San Martín - Dayari Tejada

MWP Delegates

Amazonas - Viviana Guerrero
Áncash - Cecilia Gamarra
Apurímac - Maria Greta Deza
Arequipa - Vanessa Tejada
Ayacucho - Claudia Banda
Cajamarca - Liliana Marcos
Callao - Alexandra Carreras
Cuzco - Claudia Carrasco
Distrito Capital - Sully Saenz
Huancavelica - Mayra Farje
Huánuco - Paricia Mia Verand
Junín - Silvana Lizarburu

La Libertad - Silvia Cornejo
Lambayeque - Brenda Aguirre
Madre de Dios - Eva Maria Becerra
Moquegua - Jennifer Loayza
Pasco - Amy Franco
Piura -  Maria Cristina Montenegro
Puno - Karla Chavez
San Martín - Dayari Tejada
Tacna - Macarena Flores
Tumbes - Cynthia Chanta
Ucayali - Dulcinea Prado

References

External links
Crowning Video
Miss Peru 2006

Miss Peru
2006 beauty pageants
2006 in Peru